Penicillium ootensis is a species of fungus in the genus Penicillium.

References

Further reading 
 
 

ootensis
Fungi described in 1996